Erasure.Club is a remix EP by Erasure.

In 1990, Mute released a series of rare promotional Erasure 12" singles, using the umbrella term "Erasure – Club" for the series. The four singles released were "Push Me Shove Me" (ERAS1) from the Wonderland album, "Sometimes" (ERAS2) from The Circus, "Ship of Fools" (ERAS3) from The Innocents and the standalone "Abba-esque Remixes" (ERAS4).

Erasure.Club collects six mixes from the first three 12" singles – three from ERAS1, one from ERAS2 and two from ERAS3.  ERAS4 was eventually given a commercial release.

Due to copyright issues, Fortran 5's remix "Who Needs Love (Like That) – Winnie Cooper Mix" from ERAS2 is not included on the EP.

Track listing 

Track 4 and 5 were commercially released in 1992 on the "Who Needs Love (Like That)" limited remix single.

References 

Erasure compilation albums
2009 remix albums
Mute Records remix albums